Andy Martin (born 1945) is an American perennial candidate for political office.

Andy Martin may also refer to:

Andy Martin (author), British author and academic
Andy Martin (footballer, born 1896) (1896-1978), Scottish footballer for Blackpool, Halifax Town, Rochdale and Torquay United
Andy Martin (footballer, born 1980), retired Welsh footballer
Andy Martin (English musician), singer and lyricist
Andy Martin (American musician), jazz trombonist
Andy Martin (architect) (born 1963), Australian architect and designer
Andy Martin (pentathlete) (1927–2003), British modern pentathlete

See also
Andrew Martin (disambiguation)